Endoclita damor is a species of moth of the family Hepialidae. It is known from India and the Himalayas. Food plants for this species include Albizia, Altingia, Cinchona, Coffea, Erythrina, Eugenia, Glochidion, Manglietia, Nyssa, Schima, Tectona, Tetradium, and Theobroma.

References

External links
Hepialidae genera

Moths described in 1860
Hepialidae